Josh Crutchley (born 4 June 1987) is a British Basketball coach for the Shrewsbury School and a former professional Basketball player, currently plays for the Shropshire Warriors, an amateur club competing in the National Basketball League (NBL). Growing up in Telford, Crutchley Attended Telford College of Arts and Technology (TCAT) where he made his debut in 2007 into the BBL.

The 5-foot-8-inch (1.73) guard played in the BBL for the Birmingham Panthers during the 2007/08 season.

Biography
Josh Crutchley started the game of basketball at the age of 11 whilst at Charlton School. Once scouted by  Shropshire Warriors' franchise owner, he was then appointed to play for the Shropshire Warriors basketball club under 14's and earned himself a place on the senior men's squad at the age of 14. In 2007, Crutchley signed for the Birmingham Panthers. At the end of the season, the Birmingham Panthers finished last in the league, and the team was disbanded.

Since then, he plays for the Shropshire Warriors, starting in the fourth division of the English Basketball League, and promoting to the  third division after winning the division title in the 2009/10 season.

Achievements
Josh Crutchley's achievements include:
 League Champions during his junior season 2000 with Shropshire Warriors.
 County College champions three years running 2003-2006
 College Cup winners winning 2004/6
 TCATS Student and Basketball Player of the Year 2006
 3 MVP awards with the Shropshire Warriors as well as 4 Most Improved and 2 Team Spirit

References

External links
 Shropshire Warriors Official Website 
 Charlton Ballers official website

British men's basketball players
Living people
1987 births
People from Telford
Sportspeople from Shrewsbury
Guards (basketball)